William Ryder (born 6 June 1982) is a Fijian rugby union footballer. Ryder is well known within the rugby sevens community, as he has produced some of the best performances for the Fiji national sevens side. He is well known for his try scoring capability and goosestepping defenders. He was also one of the top try scorers of the World Sevens Series which has been overtaken recently. He has scored over 750 points to-date of which he has scored 105 tries. He was a part of the team that won the sevens world cup in 2005 and also won a bronze medal at the 2006 Commonwealth Games in Melbourne, Australia for the rugby sevens event.

Ryder played club rugby in Japan with Toyota Verblitz but he left and joined the Fiji sevens team for the 2009–10 IRB Sevens World Series. On 17 May 2011 it was announced that he had signed for Stade Montois. He wanted to join the Fiji team in 2013 under the guidance of Ben Ryan for the first time in 3 years but was left from the final squad as Ryan stated he is not as fit as he was three years ago. He kept on playing for local clubs in the domestic tournament to book a place in the Fiji team but it was unsuccessful all throughout the years.

References

External links
 IRB World 7s Series 2005-06
 Fiji kings of the world
 Fiji team list
 UR7s.com – for everything 7s

1982 births
Living people
Fijian rugby union players
Rugby union fly-halves
Rugby union fullbacks
Expatriate rugby union players in Japan
Male rugby sevens players
Commonwealth Games bronze medallists for Fiji
Rugby sevens players at the 2006 Commonwealth Games
Fijian expatriate rugby union players
Fijian expatriate sportspeople in Japan
Toyota Verblitz players
Fiji international rugby sevens players
Fijian people of I-Taukei Fijian descent
People from Bua Province
Commonwealth Games medallists in rugby sevens
Commonwealth Games rugby sevens players of Fiji
Medallists at the 2006 Commonwealth Games